Neolepetopsis gordensis is a species of sea snail, a true limpet, a marine gastropod mollusk in the family Neolepetopsidae, one of the families of true limpets.

Neolepetopsis gordensis is the type species in the genus Neolepetopsis.

The specific name gordensis comes from Gorda Ridge, where this species was found.

Description

Distribution
Gorda Ridge

References

External links

Neolepetopsidae
Gastropods described in 1990